Jan Hahn (22 September 1973 – 4 May 2021) was a German radio and television presenter and actor.

Background 
Hahn had his first television experience in 2001 for the Mitteldeutscher Rundfunk as an outdoor presenter at Let's Dance. In 2002, he presented the Jan Hahn Show on the NRJ Group Berlin station.

References 

1973 births
2021 deaths
German radio presenters
German film actors
German television presenters
Sat.1 people
RTL Group people
Leipzig University alumni
Actors from Leipzig